Os Maiores Sucessos de João Penca e Seus Miquinhos Amestrados (Portuguese for "The Greatest Hits of João Penca [Banana-Bunch Joe] and His Tamed Apes") is the debut studio album by the eponymous Brazilian new wave band, despite being billed on its cover and title as a greatest hits album. It was released in 1983 by Barclay Records.

It was the band's only release to feature keyboard player Cláudio Killer, who died on December 1, 1983 due to an accidental poisonous gas leakage in his apartment while he was taking a shower, and guitarist Léo Jaime, who parted ways with João Penca in 1984 to follow a solo career.

The album counts with guest appearances by Ney Matogrosso, Lulu Santos and Chacrinha.

Covers/parodies
Every João Penca album features Portuguese-language covers/parodies of old 1940s/1950s rock and roll/rockabilly and 1960s surf music songs.

"Edmundo"
A parody of Glenn Miller's "In the Mood", originally written by Aloísio de Oliveira in the 1950s.

"O Ursinho"
A cover of Elvis Presley's "(Let Me Be Your) Teddy Bear".

"Calúnias (Telma, Eu Não Sou Gay)"
A parody of Light Reflections' "Tell Me Once Again".

Track listing

Personnel
João Penca e Seus Miquinhos Amestrados
 Selvagem Big Abreu (Sérgio Ricardo Abreu) — vocals, electric guitar
 Avellar Love (Luís Carlos de Avellar Júnior) — vocals, bass
 Bob Gallo (Marcelo Ferreira Knudsen) — vocals, drums
 Léo Jaime — electric guitar
 Cláudio Killer — keyboards

Guest musicians
 Lulu Santos — guitars in "M", "O Ursinho" and "Psicodelismo em Ipanema"
 Ney Matogrosso — additional vocals in "Calúnias"
 Chacrinha — voice in "Edmundo"
 Léo Gandelman — sax in "Calúnias"
 Cleberson Horsth — synth programming

Miscellaneous staff
 Ronaldo Bastos — production
 Eduardo Ramalho — mixing
 Léo Jaime — musical direction

References

1983 debut albums
Barclay (record label) albums
Portuguese-language albums
João Penca e Seus Miquinhos Amestrados albums